A Journey Through Filmland is a 1921 documentary about Hollywood made by Beaumont Smith during his visit there. It includes appearances from Charlie Chaplin, Douglas Fairbanks, Warren Kerrigan, Mildred Harris, Ben Turpin, Wallace Reid and Bill Hart.

References

1921 films
Australian documentary films
Australian silent films
Australian black-and-white films
1921 documentary films
Documentary films about Hollywood, Los Angeles